Big Week or Operation Argument was a sequence of raids by the United States Army Air Forces and RAF Bomber Command from 20 to 25 February 1944, as part of the European strategic bombing campaign against Nazi Germany. The planners intended to attack the German aircraft industry to lure the Luftwaffe into a decisive battle where the Luftwaffe could be damaged so badly that the Allies would achieve air superiority which would ensure success of the invasion of continental Europe.

The joint daylight bombing campaign was also supported by RAF Bomber Command operating against the same targets at night. Arthur "Bomber" Harris resisted contributing RAF Bomber Command so as not to dilute the British "area bombing" offensive. It took an order from Air Chief Marshal Sir Charles Portal, Chief of the Air Staff, to force Harris to comply.

RAF Fighter Command also provided escort for USAAF bomber formations, just at the time that the Eighth Air Force had started introducing the P-51 long-range fighter, to take over the role. The offensive overlapped the German Operation Steinbock, the Baby Blitz, which lasted from January to May 1944.

Background

In the summer of 1943, the Luftwaffe had about 2,200 fighters available on average, and several bombing raids by the USAAF and RAF were repeatedly interrupted by 500 German fighters or more. Moreover, Allied intelligence indicated that the German aircraft industry was capable of producing about 2,000–3,000 planes per month, so the need to diminish the enemy's manufacturing potential soon was evident. Therefore, massive Allied air raids on German industrial areas had been conducted throughout 1943, but to little effect; the results were far lower than the expectations. German industrial 'complexes' of multiple major factories (such as in Leipzig, Wiener Neustadt, and Regensburg) proved difficult to throroughly destroy, easy to repair, and the logistics of transporting materials between factories were almost impossible to effectively disrupt.

Prior to the Big Week, throughout 1943, the US 8th Air Force had been growing in size and experience and started pressing attacks deeper into Germany. It was originally believed that the defensive firepower of the ten or more .50 caliber machine guns on the B-17 and B-24 bombers would allow them to defend themselves as long as they remained arranged into tight formations, allowing for overlapping fire. Throughout 1942 the concept seemed solid enough, as the loss rate had been under 2%. However, the Luftwaffe reacted by affecting more planes, with heavier weaponry, to oppose the raids, with increasing success, as evidenced by the famous example  of the Schweinfurt-Regensburg missions:
On 17 August 1943, 230 USAAF bombers launched a mission against the ball bearing factories in Schweinfurt and another 146 against the aircraft factories in Regensburg. Of this force, 60 aircraft were lost before returning to base and another 87 had to be scrapped due to irreparable damage. The Germans claimed 27 fighters lost, serious enough, but small in comparison to the losses on the part of the US forces. The Second Raid on Schweinfurt on 14 October 1943, remembered as "Black Thursday" while October 1943 as a whole as a "black month"), proved even more bloody; of the 291 aircraft on the mission, 60 were lost outright, with a further 17 damaged beyond repair.
The self-defence concept appeared flawed enough, and losses among the bombers deemed unsustainable: daylight missions into Germany were cancelled in order to rebuild the forces and find new tactics to fend off German fighters.

The raids were extensively studied by both sides. The Germans concluded that their tactic of deploying twin-engine heavy fighter designs, with heavy armament to make them usable as bomber destroyers and serving primarily with the Zerstörergeschwader combat wings, was working well. Over the winter of 1943–44 they continued this program, adding to their heavy fighter ranks and developing heavier armaments for all of their aircraft. Both side observed that the US fighters did a good job at protecting bombers and destroying German fighters. So Germans pulled almost all of their fighter forces back into Germany to attack US bombers when US fighters could but leave them alone for lack of range. While Americans concluded they needed long range escort fighters, and examined all aircraft they had that could fit the role. As early as july 1943 the P-51 Mustang appeared the most promising, thanks to its range, high altitude performance, and reliability. Over the winter they re-equipped their fighter squadrons as Mustangs arrived and longer-range versions of existing fighters were developed.

By early 1944, both forces had laid their plans and were waiting to put them into action. The US, confident in a fighter advantage, planned missions that would demand a German response. They decided to make massive raids on the German fighter factories. If the Germans chose not to respond, they would be at risk of losing the air war without firing a shot; if they did respond, they would meet new long-range fighters in the process. The Germans needed no provocation: they were ready to meet a raid with their new forces. However, the increased weight of armaments in their fighters reduced performance, making them easy targets for the new and unexpected Mustangs.

Planning 
The goal of Big Week was to achieve Allied air superiority over the Luftwaffe, which was absolutely critical in advance of the upcoming D-Day invasion.

Strategy 
According to McFarland & Newton (1991), Big Week was not primarily a bombing campaign, but a campaign designed to kill Luftwaffe fighters. Two tactical factors made this difficult.  First, Luftwaffe fighters avoided Allied fighters and would simply ignore the fighter sweeps.  Thus, the Allies could not entice the Luftwaffe fighters to engage.  Second, during escort missions, Allied fighters remained in close escort formation with bombers.  This tactic limited bomber casualties but it also reduced Allied pursuit and destruction of Luftwaffe fighters.  Recognizing these problems, Major General Jimmy Doolittle, commander of Eighth Air Force from the end of 1943, ordered bombing missions of key aircraft factories that the Luftwaffe could not ignore.  In addition, Allied fighters were ordered to abandon the bombers with the primary goal of shooting down Luftwaffe fighters.  In effect, the primary purpose of the bombing missions was to bring up the Luftwaffe and the real role of the Allied bombers was to be used and sacrificed as bait.

On the other hand, Brinkhuis (1984) contended that the operation's target was attacking Germany's aircraft industry, 'going back to a plan that had already been made in October 1943. This plan, operation Argument, was the biggest Allied air action so far. The ambitious enterprise had the total destruction of the German aircraft industry as its goal.' 'The manufacture of these [fighters, such as Messerschitt 109, 110, and the Focke-Wulf 190], saw such a steep rise that the USAAF and RAF had good reason to fear that the defence of Hitler's Festung Europa with all these aircraft would lead to a horrible massacre amongst Allied flight crews. Therefore, the primary goal of the Allied airforce became the destruction of the factories producing these aircraft.' Planners estimated that the Allies would lose between 7% to 18% of their aircraft every day; given that the campaign was to last six days, the expectation was thus that between 42% and 100% of all aircraft (981 bombers in total) would be lost. In order to achieve the objective, U.S. commander Frederick L. Anderson was prepared to sacrifice three quarters of all planes and crew (meaning 736 bombers). The Allies proceeded to gather intelligence on all parts of German industry involved in producing parts, engines, wings and airframes, as well as assembling factories. However, operational success was foreseen to heavily depend on several consecutive days of good weather, meaning ideal cloud covers between about 600 to 4,000 metres above England, but no clouds above the target areas in Germany. As such a situation was extremely rare, leadership decided to launch the campaign anyway as soon as the forecast showed the smallest signs of acceptable flying weather.

Allied order of battle 
As of 22 February 1944.
 United States Strategic Air Forces in Europe – lieutenant general Carl Spaatz
 U.S. Eighth Air Force – major general James H. Doolittle, major general Frederick Lewis Anderson
 2nd Bombardment Division
 20th Combat Bombardment Wing (first wave, commanded by formation leader William R. Schmidt)
 93d Bombardment Group
 446th Bombardment Group
 448th Bombardment Group
 14th Combat Bombardment Wing (second wave)
 44th Bombardment Group
 392nd Bombardment Group
 2nd Combat Bombardment Wing (third wave)
 389th Bombardment Group
 445th Bombardment Group
 453rd Bombardment Group
 3rd Bombardment Division – major general Curtis LeMay
 333 Boeing B-17 Flying Fortress bombers

There were 981 bomber aircraft available for Operation Argument in total. The B-24 Liberator usually had a crew of ten men, sometimes with an extra navigator. Each bombardment group usually consisted of 36 bombers.

Operations

The Americans flew continuously escorted missions against airframe manufacturing and assembly plants and other targets in numerous German cities including: Leipzig, Brunswick, Gotha, Regensburg, Schweinfurt, Augsburg, Stuttgart and Steyr. In six days, the Eighth Air Force bombers based in England flew more than 3,000 sorties and the Fifteenth Air Force based in Italy more than 500. Together they dropped roughly 10,000 tons of bombs.

USAAF bomber sorties

RAF bomber sorties 
Bomber Command directly contributed to the attacks on the aircraft industry in Schweinfurt. Some 734 bombers were dispatched on the night of 24/25 February, and 695 reported they struck the target. However, analysis of the photographs taken during the raid showed that only 298 of the aircraft dropped their bombs within three miles of the aiming point. Of these, only 22 hit inside the target area; that is, they came down within the boundaries of the built-up districts of the city. Little damage was done due to creepback: marker aircraft dropped markers short, and bombers dropped their payload at the first markers seen rather than at the centre of the markers.

On 25/26 February 1944, Bomber Command sent almost 600 aircraft to the aircraft assembly plant at Augsburg. This time, the markers were dropped accurately, therefore the attack was accurate and destroyed some 60 percent of the industrial city.

Analysis

Allied losses 
During Big Week, the Eighth Air Force lost 97 B-17s, 40 B-24s and another 20 scrapped due to damage. The operational strength of the Eighth Air Force bomber units had dropped from 75 percent at the start of the week to 54 percent, and its fighter units strength had dropped from 72 percent of establishment strength to 65 percent. The Fifteenth Air Force lost 14.6 percent (90 bombers) of establishment strength, and RAF Bomber Command lost 131 bombers (5.7 percent) during Big Week. Although these numbers are high in absolute terms, the numbers of bombers involved in the missions were much higher than previously, and the losses represented a much smaller percentage of the attacking force. The earlier Schweinfurt missions had cost the force nearly 30 percent of their aircraft per mission.

German losses 
US aircrews claimed more than 500 German fighters destroyed, though the numbers were massively exaggerated. The Luftwaffe losses were high amongst their twin-engined Zerstörer units, and the Bf 110 and Me 410 groups were severely depleted. More worrying for the Jagdwaffe (fighter force) than the loss of 355 aircraft was the loss of nearly 100 pilots (14 percent) who had been killed. In contrast to the raids of the previous year, the US losses were replaceable, while the Germans were already hard pressed due to the war in the East. Although not fatal, Big Week was an extremely worrying development for the Germans. The lack of skilled pilots due to an attrition in the three-front war was the factor eroding the capability of the Jagdwaffe.

According to McFarland & Newton (1991), the purported Allied strategy of sacrificing bombers in order to lure and kill Luftwaffe fighters was very effective. Freed of close bomber escort duty, Allied fighters, particularly the P-51s, decimated the Luftwaffe. German aircraft and pilot losses could not be sufficiently replaced. As a result, the Allies achieved air superiority by the time of the D-Day invasion.

Allied bombing results 
The actual damage to the German aircraft industry was fairly limited; during 1944 German fighter aircraft production peaked by dispersing production and reducing the production of other aircraft types.
 20 February: The 3rd Bombardment Division failed to reach its target, the Tutow complex, due to long-hanging clouds. It attacked its secondary target Rostock instead.  The 1st and 2nd Bombardment Divisions also failed to find their objectives, and bombed other places instead.
 21 February: None of the 924 bombers who had departed hit their original targets, but diverted to other targets instead.
 22 February: 252 B-24s were readied for combat, but due to various formation problems, only 177 took off, and only 74 saw combat action. During formation, several accidents occurred resulting in crashes and the deaths of dozens of crew members. Because of this, and the fact that low-hanging clouds were reported across central Germany, none of the 333 Boeing B-17 Flying Fortress bombers of the 3rd Bombardment Division reached their targets, as all of them were recalled early to prevent disaster. The remaining B-24s received the order to return to England much later, and efforts to turn the formation around caused chaos and fragmenting; on the way back to base, they looked for targets of opportunity, and eventually the Dutch cities of Nijmegen, Arnhem, Deventer and Enschede were selected and attacked. Approximately 880 civilians were killed in the disorderly Bombing of Nijmegen, while the actual target of opportunity, Nijmegen railway station (used for German arms transport), was barely damaged. In Enschede, 40 civilians were killed, 41 were injured, and hundreds of homes destroyed, causing 700 civilians to become homeless; the likely target of opportunity, in the middle of a residential area, was a small factory producing components for German missiles. In Arnhem, 57 civilians were killed and 86 homes destroyed, affecting 464 families in the residential areas of Rijnwijk and Malburgen; the target of opportunity was the Arnhem Rubber Factory (Arufa) on industrial terrain Het Broek, whose production capacity was largely in service of the German war effort.
 23 February: All operations were suspended due to bad weather and for investigating operational failures during the previous day, especially the Bombing of Nijmegen.
 24/25 February: RAF conducted a very ineffective attack on the aircraft industry in Schweinfurt, doing little damage.
 25/26 February 1944: RAF carried out an accurate and effective attack on Augsburg, destroying some 60 percent of the industrial city.

Aftermath

Humanitarian impact 

The Bombing of Nijmegen on 22 February, which resulted from the aborted attack on the Gothaer Waggonfabrik, was a disaster in terms of barely damaging any targets of military importance while killing hundreds of civilians of the Netherlands (approximately 880 civilian deaths in Nijmegen), whose government-in-exile in London was part of the Allied coalition. On the day after the raid, 23 February, the Allied air force launched an investigation: all air raids planned for that day were cancelled (also due to poor weather conditions), and all flyers and briefing officers involved were held on the base and questioned. In London, a diplomatic incident occurred between the American, British and Dutch military and civilian commanders and officials about what had happened, who should be granted access to which information, and in which order, and who should ultimately be held responsible, creating distrust within the Allied leadership for some time. The American military command was relatively late in drawing lessons from the disorderly air raid, which had struck an ally's civilian population hard. Not until mid-May 1944, orders were given to seek out targets of opportunity at least 30 kilometres away from the Netherlands' border. Nazi German propaganda attempted to exploit the tragedy in order to counter pro-Allied sympathies amongst the Dutch civilian population, but these efforts appear to have been ineffective, and perhaps even counterproductive.

Brinkhuis (1984) stated that several Allied actions during Operation Argument allowed the Allies to achieve air superiority, which would make subsequent bombing raids less risky and chaotic, and more effective. The tragic failures of the 22 February bombings of Dutch cities no one had ever heard of, which had resulted in almost a thousand civilian casualties and major infrastructural damage, were initially brushed off as an 'incident', and Operation Argument would be glorified as 'Big Week' in Allied historiography.

Military impact 
Otherwise, Big Week bolstered the confidence of US strategic bombing crews. Until that time, Allied bombers avoided contact with the Luftwaffe; now, the Americans used any method that would force the Luftwaffe into combat. Implementing this policy, the United States looked toward Berlin. Raiding the German capital, Allied leaders reasoned, would force the Luftwaffe to battle. On March 4, the USSTAF launched the first of several attacks against Berlin. A force of 730 bombers set off from England with an escort of 800 fighters. Fierce battles raged and resulted in heavy losses for both sides; 69 B-17s were lost but it cost the Luftwaffe 160 aircraft. The Allies, again, replaced their losses; the Luftwaffe, again, could not.

The new German tactics of using Sturmböcke (heavily armed Fw 190s) as bomber destroyers and Bf 109Gs to escort them in Gefechtsverband formations, were proving somewhat effective. The US fighters, kept in close contact with the bombers they were protecting, could not chase the attacking fighters before they were forced to turn around and return to the bombers. General Doolittle responded by initiating a breakthrough in fighter tactics by "freeing" the fighters, allowing them to fly far ahead of the heavy bomber formations in an air supremacy "fighter sweep" mode on the outward legs; then following the USAAF heavies' bomb runs, the fighters roamed far from the bomber streams and hunted down German fighters — especially the Sturmböcke, that had limited maneuverability with their heavy underwing conformal gun pod-mount autocannons — before they could ever approach the USAAF bombers. Though the change was unpopular with the bomber crews, its effects were immediate and extremely effective.

The Combined Bomber Offensive attacks against fighter production officially ended on April 1, 1944 and control of the air forces passed to US General Dwight D. Eisenhower in preparation for the invasion of France.  Allied airmen were well on the way to achieving air superiority over all of Europe. "While they continued strategic bombing, the USAAF turned its attention to the tactical air battle in support of the Normandy invasion".

See also
 Operation Steinbock, the German "baby blitz" against the UK, that was ongoing simultaneously with the "Big Week" campaign and afterwards.

References

Citations

Bibliography 

 
 
 
 
 
Journals

Further reading 
 Scutts, J. (1994). Mustang Aces of the Eighth Air Force, Osprey Publishing, 
 Weal, John. (2006). Bf 109 Defense of the Reich Aces, Osprey Publishing, 
 Yenne, Bill.  (2012). "Big Week: Six Days That Changed The Course of World War II"; Penguin; 

Aerial operations and battles of World War II involving Germany
Aerial operations and battles of World War II involving the United Kingdom
Aerial operations and battles of World War II involving the United States
World War II aerial operations and battles of the Western European Theatre
World War II strategic bombing lists
February 1944 events
1944 in Germany
1944 in the Netherlands